aka Erotic Sisters is a 1972 Japanese film in Nikkatsu's Roman porno series, directed by Chūsei Sone and starring Keiko Tsuzuki and Akemi Nijō.

Synopsis
Three sisters live alienated existences in modern-day Tokyo. One works as a secretary, one is a prostitute, and one is a criminal. The secretary is cynically unhappy with the sexist business world which limits her opportunities for advancement and makes her a target for her lecherous boss. The prostitute lives an aimless life, drifting between men, and often the target of either police or jealous wives. The criminal, who lives by disrupting the society which oppresses her two sisters, is the only happy one of the three.

Cast
 Akemi Nijō: Satsuki Ōtsuki
 Keiko Tsuzuki: Shinobu Ōtsuki
 Senro Sō: Sumire Ōtsuki
 Chigusa Takayama: Fujie Ōtsuki
 Kenji Shimamura: Denkichi Ōtsuki
 Nobutaka Masutoko: Honda Rokurō
 Hiroyuki Mikawa: Ichirō Sawaki
 Kiyoko Ōtani: Miyo Sawaki
 Mako Mizuki: Yōko Ikuta

Background and critical appraisal
In their Japanese Cinema Encyclopedia: The Sex Films, the Weissers fault the film for its story, but praise director Sone for raising the film above its exploitation origins. According to the Weissers, the film is "a great looking production", and Sone gives the characters humanity. Nevertheless, they point out, in line with the exploitation genre, Sone delivers some "chillingly savage" moments. Allmovie agrees that the film is "not for the timid", but judges that it was one of Nikkatsu's better Roman Pornos of 1972. Dealing with societal alienation, self-destruction and violence, the film works with themes that director Hisayasu Satō would make his own in the 1980s and 1990s.

Director Chūsei Sone worked as an assistant director to Seijun Suzuki during the 1960s. He is probably best known for the first two episodes of the Angel Guts series, which he directed in 1978 and 1979. Lead actress Keiko Tsuzuki had a leading role in Yasuharu Hasebe's Kurosawa satire, Naked Seven (1974).

Availability
Lusty Sisters was released theatrically in Japan on November 29, 1972. It was released on DVD in Japan on December 22, 2006, as part of Geneon's sixth wave of Nikkatsu Roman porno series.

Bibliography

English

Japanese

Notes

1972 films
Films directed by Chūsei Sone
1970s Japanese-language films
Nikkatsu films
Nikkatsu Roman Porno
1970s Japanese films